The 1923–24 Luxembourg National Division was the 14th season of top level association football in Luxembourg.

Overview
It was contested by 8 teams, and CS Fola Esch won the championship.

League standings

Results

References
Luxembourg - List of final tables (RSSSF)

Luxembourg National Division seasons
Lux
Nat